Charles Douglas Clark (July 11, 1902 – May 2, 1964), nicknamed "Sensation", was an American Negro league pitcher in the 1920s.

A native of Americus, Georgia, Clark attended Morehouse College. He made his Negro leagues debut in 1922 with the Pittsburgh Keystones. He went on to play for the Indianapolis ABCs the following season, and finished his career in 1924 with the Cleveland Browns and Memphis Red Sox. Clark died in Pittsburgh, Pennsylvania in 1964 at age 61.

References

External links
 and Seamheads

1902 births
1964 deaths
Cleveland Browns (baseball) players
Indianapolis ABCs players
Memphis Red Sox players
Pittsburgh Keystones players
Baseball pitchers
Baseball players from Georgia (U.S. state)
People from Americus, Georgia
20th-century African-American sportspeople